Harrison Courtney is a New Zealand rugby union player for Edinburgh Rugby in the United Rugby Championship. Courtney's primary position is prop.

Rugby Union career

Professional career
Courtney represented  in the 2019 Mitre 10 Cup.

External links
itsrugby Profile

References

Living people
New Zealand rugby union players
Edinburgh Rugby players
Rugby union props
Canterbury rugby union players
1997 births